Bradley Brandon (born September 1, 1989), professionally known as Doughboy Beatz or simply Doughboy, is an American record producer from Columbus, Mississippi. He is perhaps best known for producing "Pedestrian" by rapper Gunna, as well as "Lost It" by rapper Rich The Kid featuring Offset and Quavo of Migos which was certified gold by the RIAA.

Doughboy has produced several tracks for various artists such as Young Jeezy, Gucci Mane, Future, Yo Gotti, Juicy J, 21 Savage, NBA Youngboy, Lil Boosie, Soulja Boy, Shy Glizzy, YFN Lucci, Plies, Trina, Crooked I, B.G, CyHi the Prynce, among others. He has earned a Grammy Nomination for his work on 21 Savage's I Am > I Was for Best Rap Album at the 62nd Annual Grammy Awards.

Early life and career
Brandon started making beats at the age of 15, for his younger brother on FL Studio. He then went on to produce Hitz Committee/Jive Records signee, Trai'D's lead single "Gutta Chick" in 2008. "Gutta Chick" peaked at number 72 on the Billboard Hot R&B/Hip-Hop Songs charts.  Doughboy has worked with many other major artists since then.

Throughout the 2010s, Doughboy has followed up with production on many highly acclaimed projects that include Jeezy's Trap or Die 2, Shy Glizzy's Law 3, Rich The Kid's The World Is Yours, Gunna's Drip Season 3 and Gucci Mane's East Atlanta Santa.

Brandon has also worked with other music producers that include Metro Boomin, Wheezy, Drumma Boy, Southside, Zaytoven, Shawty Redd, Sonny Digital, Honorable C.N.O.T.E., DJ Paul, Juicy J and more.

In September 2019, Doughboy signed with Metro Boomin's Boominati Worldwide label.   Boominati Worldwide has a partnership with Republic Records and Universal Music Group.

Doughboy is also rumored to be in relationship with popular Instagram star and model Katherine Estrella, also known as Strella Kat.

Discography

Studio albums

Production Credits

2008

Soulja Boy 
 00. "Pistol Play"

Tha Joker
 00. "Respect Me" (feat. Yung Envy)
 00. "Allow Me To Introduce Myself"
 00. "Pull Out The Old Skool"
 00. "Real Talk"
 00. "My Alarm"
 00. "Put It On My Face" (feat. CG Whatitdew)
 00. "My Ride"

Trai'D
 00. "Gutta Chick"
 00. "Hit Da Flo"

Ace Hood - All Bets on Ace
 09. "Gutta Bitch"

Trai'D - Don't Worry I Got It
 00. "Gutta Chick" (remix) (feat. DJ Khaled, Ace Hood, Trina, Bun B & Hurricane Chris)

Jibbs
 00. "Whippin The Rhyme"

2009

Cyhi Da Prynce - What Da Decs Been Missin Vol.1 
 11. "Get Away"

Crooked I - After Inauguration 
 09. "Prove Them Wrong"

OJ Da Juiceman - Alaska In Atlanta 
 03. "Haters"

Waka Flocka Flame - Shootin The Breeze Cookin That Fire 
 13. "Mrs. Flocka"

Arab - Arab Money
 03. "Chingaling"

J-Bar - Da Guap
 05. "I Want Her (OJ With The Vodka)" (feat. Soulja Boy)
 06. "Sway"

Waka Flocka Flame  & Slim Dunkin - Twin Towers
 06. "I Love" (feat. Capp)

2010Jeezy - Trap or Die 2 
 06. "My Camaro"Alley Boy - Definition Of Fuck Shit Vol. 1 
 15. "Finesse"Tay Don - Death Of Tay Beatz 
 04. "Robbin Season"
 05. "Knock Knock"
 18. "Keep On Pushing"DJ Genius & DJ Blu Present Envy, Nation & Cyco - Black Sunday 05. "Bump Dey HeadP. Dukes - Dirty Glove Bastard & Baller's Eve Present: Block Tested, Hood Approved 01. "Block Tested, Hood Approved" (Produced with Sonny Digital)

2011Doe Boy & Lex Luger - Boyz N Da Hood 
 06. "Real Talk"
 11. "Street Commandments"Lil Boosie & Ray Vicks - Under Investigation 
 02. "Go Hard"
 09. "Ur Name"
 11. "I Pledge Allegiance"
 12. "Xstacy"
 13. "Top Ten"
 15. "Under Investigation"Lil Twist 
 00. "Got Her Like"B.G. 
 00. "Playing Games" (feat. Lil Boosie & Gar)Kourtney Money - OJ Da Juiceman Presents 32 Ent: The Compilation 00. "We Out Chea" (Produced with Metro Boomin)

2012Starlito  - Mental Warfare 
 02. "Hope For Love"8Ball - Premro 
 07. "Jumpin Up"Shawty Redd  - Rap Now, Produce Later 
 10. "Remy" (feat. Project Pat)GC Eternal of Kinfolk Thugs 00. "They Don't Make Em Like This" (feat. Playa Fly and MJG)

2013Rich The Kid 00. "Couple Bandz"
 00. "Whole Hood" (feat. Sy Ari Da Kid)DJ Paul & Drumma Boy - Clash Of The Titans 05. "Cocaine"Yo Gotti 00. "Lost Count" (feat. Lil' Lody)Gucci Mane & Young Scooter - Free Bricks 2 03. "Not Ballin" (Produced with Metro Boomin)8Ball - Premro 2 01. "Bigger Vision"Tha Joker - The Explanation 00. "F.H.I.T.O."

2014Gucci Mane - East Atlanta Santa 12. "Riding Dirty" (Produced with Metro Boomin  & Honorable C.N.O.T.E.)Shy Glizzy - Law 3 05. "What U Talkin Bout"

2015Chief Keef 00. "Road Runner" (Produced with Metro Boomin & Jay-O Luciano)Shy Glizzy & Glizzy Gang - Be Careful 04. "Above The Rim"OJ Da Juiceman - Bouldercrest El Chapo 06. "So Much" (Produced with Metro Boomin)
 13. "Millionaire Dreams"Tha Joker 00. "F.H.I.T.O." (feat. Riff Raff, K Camp & Raven Felix)

2016Shy Glizzy - Young Jefe 2 04. "New Crack"Tha Joker & Doughboy Beatz - October 31: The Mixtape 01. "Old Ways"
 02. "Bandit"
 03. "Soirée"
 05. "Juice"
 07. "Run Up"
 08. "4 A.M."

2017Doe Boy - In FreeBandz We Trust 2 01. "Savage Back"Money Man - Secret Society 01. "Secret Society" (Produced with Trauma Tone)Shy Glizzy - Quiet Storm 01. "Quiet Storm"  
 11. "Keep It Goin"Starlito & Don Trip - Step Brothers 3 
 13. "Remember"Starlito - Manifest Destiny 04. "Too Much" (Produced with Metro Boomin)Tha Joker - Why So Serious 3? 01. "45" 
 02. "Run Up"  
 03. "Blue Strips" (Produced with Trauma Tone)
 05. "4 A.M"  
 09. "Piece Of Mind"  
 10. "I'd Rather"

2018Gunna - Drip Season 3 05. "Pedestrian" (Produced with Metro Boomin & Wheezy)Juicy J - 901 Drip 
 11. "Built" (feat. YKOM) (Produced with Juicy J & YK808)Money Man - Grow God 
 09. "Fake Friends" (Produced with Trauma Tone)NBA Youngboy - 4Respect 4Freedom 4Loyalty 4WhatImportant 
 16. "We Dem" (Produced with DJ Swift)Plies - Ain't No Mixtape Bih 3 18. "Best Life" (Produced with Trauma Tone)Q Money - Neva Had Shit 09. "Whole Ticket" (feat. YFN Lucci)(Produced with Trauma Tone)Rich The Kid - The World Is Yours 
 09. "Lost It" (feat. Offset & Quavo of Migos) (Produced with Metro Boomin & Wheezy)Shy Glizzy - Fully Loaded 18. "I Need Mo"21 Savage - I Am > I Was 02. "Break Da Law" (Produced with Metro Boomin & Southside)

2019Offset - Father of 4 09. "Don't Lose Me" (Produced with Metro Boomin)
 09. "On Fleek" (feat. Quavo) (Produced with Metro Boomin & Zaytoven)Gunna 00. "Mr. T" (Produced with Metro Boomin)Future 00. "Perkies" (Produced with Metro Boomin)D-Block Europe - PTSD 23. "Back To Back" (Produced with Tre Pounds of 808 Mafia)Gucci Mane - Woptober II 13. "Break Bread" (Produced with Metro Boomin)BAD HOP - Lift Off 02. "Double Up" (Produced with Metro Boomin)Gucci Mane - East Atlanta Santa 3 9. “She Miss Me” (feat. Rich The Kid) (Produced with Metro Boomin & Dre Moon)

2020Offset 00. "World Guinness (Wrist On Froze)" (Produced with Metro Boomin)

2021Sada Baby 00. "1955" (Produced with Trauma Tone)SG TIP 
 00. "One In The Head" (feat. 21 Lil Harold & Slimelife Shawty) (Produced with Metro Boomin)Young Dolph - "Paper Route Illuminati"
 17. "Trust Nobody" (Produced with Bandplay)

2022Lil Durk & Metro Boomin - No Auto Durk
 00. "Confessions" (Produced with Metro Boomin)
 00. "Spot News" (Produced with Metro Boomin)Big Scarr 
 00. "The Regular" (Produced with Bandplay)Gucci Mane 
 00. "Blood All On It" (feat. Key Glock and Young Dolph) (Produced with Bandplay)Big Moochie Grape - East Haiti Baby 13. "Acting Up" (Produced with Bandplay)EBG EJizzle - Walking With The Devil'''
 02. "Safe To Say" (Produced with Bandplay)

References

External links 

 Official Web site
 
 

1989 births
20th-century African-American people
21st-century African-American people
African-American record producers
American hip hop record producers
Living people
Musicians from Mississippi
Southern hip hop musicians